Ernest André Gellner FRAI (9 December 1925 – 5 November 1995) was a British-Czech philosopher and social anthropologist described by The Daily Telegraph, when he died, as one of the world's most vigorous intellectuals, and by The Independent as a "one-man crusader for critical rationalism".

His first book, Words and Things (1959), prompted a leader in The Times and a month-long correspondence on its letters page over his attack on linguistic philosophy. As the Professor of Philosophy, Logic and Scientific Method at the London School of Economics for 22 years, the William Wyse Professor of Social Anthropology at the University of Cambridge for eight years, and head of the new Centre for the Study of Nationalism in Prague, Gellner fought all his life—in his writing, teaching and political activism—against what he saw as closed systems of thought, particularly communism, psychoanalysis, relativism and the dictatorship of the free market. Among other issues in social thought, modernization theory and nationalism were two of his central themes, his multicultural perspective allowing him to work within the subject-matter of three separate civilizations: Western, Islamic, and Russian. He is considered one of the leading theoreticians on the issue of nationalism.

Background
Gellner was born in Paris to Anna, née Fantl, and Rudolf, a lawyer, an urban intellectual German-speaking Austrian Jewish couple from Bohemia (which, since 1918, was part of the newly established Czechoslovakia). Julius Gellner was his uncle. He was brought up in Prague, attending a Czech language primary school before entering the English-language grammar school. This was Franz Kafka's tricultural Prague: antisemitic but "stunningly beautiful", a city he later spent years longing for.

In 1939, when Gellner was 13, the rise of Adolf Hitler in Germany persuaded his family to leave Czechoslovakia and move to St Albans, just north of London, where Gellner attended St Albans Boys Modern School, now Verulam School (Hertfordshire). At the age of 17, he won a scholarship to Balliol College, Oxford, as a result of what he called "Portuguese colonial policy", which involved keeping "the natives peaceful by getting able ones from below into Balliol."

At Balliol, he studied Philosophy, Politics and Economics (PPE) and specialised in philosophy. He interrupted his studies after one year to serve with the 1st Czechoslovak Armoured Brigade, which took part in the Siege of Dunkirk (1944–45), and then returned to Prague to attend university there for half a term.

During this period, Prague lost its strong hold over him: foreseeing the communist takeover, he decided to return to England. One of his recollections of the city in 1945 was a communist poster saying: "Everyone with a clean shield into the Party", ostensibly meaning that those whose records were good during the occupation were welcome. In reality, Gellner said, it meant exactly the opposite:

He returned to Balliol College in 1945 to finish his degree, winning the John Locke prize and taking first class honours in 1947. The same year, he began his academic career at the University of Edinburgh as an assistant to Professor John Macmurray in the Department of Moral Philosophy. He moved to the London School of Economics in 1949, joining the sociology department under Morris Ginsberg. Ginsberg admired philosophy and believed that philosophy and sociology were very close to each other.

Leonard Trelawny Hobhouse had preceded Ginsberg as Martin White Professor of Sociology at the LSE. Hobhouse's Mind in Evolution (1901) had proposed that society should be regarded as an organism, a product of evolution, with the individual as its basic unit, the subtext being that society would improve over time as it evolved, a teleological view that Gellner firmly opposed.

Gellner's critique of linguistic philosophy in Words and Things (1959) focused on J. L. Austin and the later work of Ludwig Wittgenstein, criticizing them for failing to question their own methods. The book brought Gellner critical acclaim. He obtained his Ph.D. in 1961 with a thesis on Organization and the Role of a Berber Zawiya and became Professor of Philosophy, Logic and Scientific Method just one year later. Thought and Change was published in 1965, and in State and Society in Soviet Thought (1988), he examined whether Marxist regimes could be liberalized.

He was elected to the British Academy in 1974. He moved to Cambridge in 1984 to head the Department of Anthropology, holding the William Wyse chair and becoming a fellow of King's College, Cambridge, which provided him with a relaxed atmosphere where he enjoyed drinking beer and playing chess with the students. Described by the Oxford Dictionary of National Biography as "brilliant, forceful, irreverent, mischievous, sometimes perverse, with a biting wit and love of irony", he was famously popular with his students, was willing to spend many extra hours a day tutoring them, and was regarded as a superb public speaker and gifted teacher.

His Plough, Sword and Book (1988) investigated the philosophy of history, and Conditions of Liberty (1994) sought to explain the collapse of socialism with an analogy he called "modular man". In 1993, he returned to Prague, now rid of communism, and to the new Central European University, where he became head of the Center for the Study of Nationalism, a program funded by George Soros, the American billionaire philanthropist, to study the rise of nationalism in the post-communist countries of eastern and central Europe. On 5 November 1995, after returning from a conference in Budapest, he suffered a heart attack and died at his flat in Prague, one month short of his 70th birthday.

Gellner was a member of both the American Academy of Arts and Sciences and the American Philosophical Society.

Words and Things

With the publication in 1959 of Words and Things, his first book, Gellner achieved fame and even notoriety among his fellow philosophers, as well as outside the discipline, for his fierce attack on "linguistic philosophy", as he preferred to call ordinary language philosophy, then  the dominant approach at Oxbridge (although the philosophers themselves denied that they were part of any unified school). He first encountered the strong ideological hold of linguistic philosophy while at Balliol:

Words and Things is fiercely critical of the work of Ludwig Wittgenstein, J. L. Austin, Gilbert Ryle, Antony Flew, P. F. Strawson and many others. Ryle refused to have the book reviewed in the philosophical journal Mind (which he edited), and Bertrand Russell (who had written an approving foreword) protested in a letter to The Times. A response from Ryle and a lengthy correspondence ensued.

Social anthropology
In the 1950s, Gellner discovered his great love of social anthropology. Chris Hann, director of the Max Planck Institute for Social Anthropology, writes that following the hard-nosed empiricism of Bronisław Malinowski, Gellner made major contributions to the subject over the next 40 years, ranging from "conceptual critiques in the analysis of kinship to frameworks for understanding political order outside the state in tribal Morocco (Saints of the Atlas, 1969); from sympathetic exposition of the works of Soviet Marxist anthropologists to elegant syntheses of the Durkheimian and Weberian traditions in western social theory; and from grand elaboration of 'the structure of human history' to path-breaking analyses of ethnicity and nationalism (Thought and Change, 1964; Nations and Nationalism, 1983)". He also developed a friendship with the Moroccan-French sociologist Paul Pascon, whose work he admired.

Nationalism

In 1983, Gellner published Nations and Nationalism. For Gellner, "nationalism is primarily a political principle that holds that the political and the national unit should be congruent". Gellner argues that nationalism appeared and became a sociological necessity only in the modern world. In previous times ("the agro-literate" stage of history), rulers had little incentive to impose cultural homogeneity on the ruled. But in modern society, work becomes technical; one must operate a machine, and to do so, one must learn. There is a need for impersonal, context-free communication and a high degree of cultural standardisation.

Furthermore, industrial society is underlined by the fact that there is perpetual growth: employment types vary and new skills must be learned. Thus, generic employment training precedes specialised job training. On a territorial level, there is competition for the overlapping catchment areas (such as Alsace-Lorraine). To maintain its grip on resources and its survival and progress, the state and culture must for these reasons be congruent. Nationalism, therefore, is a necessity.

Selected works
Words and Things, A Critical Account of Linguistic Philosophy and a Study in Ideology, London: Gollancz; Boston: Beacon (1959). Also see correspondence in The Times, 10 November to 23 November 1959.
 Thought and Change (1964)
Populism: Its Meaning and Characteristics (1969). With . New York: Macmillan.
 Saints of the Atlas (1969)
 Contemporary Thought and Politics (1974)
 The Devil in Modern Philosophy (1974)
 Legitimation of Belief (1974)
 Spectacles and Predicaments (1979)
 Soviet and Western Anthropology (1980) (editor)
 Muslim Society (1981)
 Nations and Nationalism (1983)
 Relativism and the Social Sciences (1985)
 The Psychoanalytic Movement (1985)
 The Concept of Kinship and Other Essays (1986)
 Culture, Identity and Politics (1987)
 State and Society in Soviet Thought (1988)
 Plough, Sword and Book (1988)
 Postmodernism, Reason and Religion (1992)
 Reason and Culture (1992)
 Conditions of Liberty (1994)
 Anthropology and Politics: Revolutions in the Sacred Grove (1995)
 Liberalism in Modern Times: Essays in Honour of José G. Merquior (1996)
 Nationalism (1997)
 Language and Solitude: Wittgenstein, Malinowski and the Habsburg Dilemma (1998)

Notes

References
Obituary A Philosopher on Nationalism Ernest Gellner Died at 69 written by Eric Pace The New York Times 10 November 1995
Davies, John. Obituary in The Guardian, 7 November 1995
Dimonye, Simeon. A Comparative Study of Historicism in Karl Marx and Ernest Gellner (Saarbrücken: Lambert Academic Publishing, 2012)
Hall, John A. Ernest Gellner: An Intellectual Biography (London: Verso, 2010)
Hall, John A. and Ian Jarvie (eds). The Social Philosophy of Ernest Gellner (Amsterdam: Rodopi B.V., 1996)
Hall, John A. (ed.) The State of the Nation: Ernest Gellner and the Theory of Nationalism (Cambridge: Cambridge University Press, 1998)
Lessnoff, Michael. Ernest Gellner and Modernity (Cardiff: University of Wales Press, 2002)
Lukes, Steven. "Gellner, Ernest André (1925–1995)", Oxford Dictionary of National Biography, Oxford University Press, 2004, retrieved 23 September 2005 (requires subscription)
Malesevic, Sinisa and Mark Haugaard (eds). Ernest Gellner and Contemporary Social Thought (Cambridge: Cambridge University Press, 2007)
O'Leary, Brendan. Obituary in The Independent, 8 November 1995
Stirling, Paul. Obituary in The Daily Telegraph, 9 November 1995
"The Social and Political Relevance of Gellner's Thought Today" papers and webcast of conference organised by the Department of Political Science and Sociology in the National University of Ireland, Galway, held on 21–22 May 2005 (10th anniversary of Gellner's death).
 Kyrchanoff, Maksym. Natsionalizm: politika, mezhdunarodnye otnosheniia, regionalizatsiia (Voronezh, 2007)  Detailed review of Gellner's works for students. In Russian language.

External links

 Gellner resource page (at the London School of Economics)
 Ethics and Logic, Proceedings of the Aristotelian Society LV (1954–1955), 157–178.
 Catalogue of the Gellner papers at the Archives Division of the London School of Economics.
 Gellner video materials, at Dspace at Cambridge repository (MP4 files).
 Special Issue of the journal Social Evolution & History  "The Intellectual Legacy of Ernest Gellner" (guest editor Peter Skalnik).
 Special Issue of the journal Thesis Eleven Ernest Gellner and Historical Sociology  (guest editor Sinisa Malesevic).
 The Words and Things of Ernest Gellner by Czeglédy, André P.
Linguistic Philosophy 1959 review of Words and Things by A.J. Ayer for The Spectator [via Wayback Machine]
Words and Ideas review of Words and Things by Iris Murdoch for The Partisan Review
 

1925 births
1995 deaths
20th-century anthropologists
20th-century British male writers
20th-century British philosophers
20th-century educational theorists
20th-century educators
20th-century essayists
20th-century English historians
20th-century social scientists
Academics of the London School of Economics
Academics of the University of Edinburgh
Alumni of Balliol College, Oxford
Analytic philosophers
Anthropologists of religion
Anti-capitalists
British academics
British anthropologists
British anti-communists
British educational theorists
British essayists
British ethicists
British logicians
British male non-fiction writers
British social sciences writers
British social scientists
British sociologists
Academic staff of Central European University
Critical rationalists
Critics of alternative medicine
Cultural anthropologists
Czech anti-communists
Czech Jews
Czech scientists
Czechoslovak refugees
Economic anthropologists
Fellows of King's College, Cambridge
Fellows of the British Academy
Fellows of the Royal Anthropological Institute of Great Britain and Ireland
Jewish anthropologists
Jewish educators
Jewish ethicists
Jewish historians
Jewish non-fiction writers
Jewish philosophers
Jewish refugees
Jewish social scientists
Jewish sociologists
Jews who immigrated to the United Kingdom to escape Nazism
Literacy and society theorists
Members of the American Philosophical Society
Ordinary language philosophy
People educated at St Albans School, Hertfordshire
Philosophers of culture
Philosophers of economics
Philosophers of education
Philosophers of history
Philosophers of language
Philosophers of linguistics
Philosophers of logic
Philosophers of religion
Philosophers of social science
Philosophers of war
Philosophy academics
Philosophy writers
Populism scholars
Political philosophers
Political sociologists
Presidents of the Royal Anthropological Institute of Great Britain and Ireland
Revolution theorists
Rhetoric theorists
Scholars of nationalism
Social anthropologists
Social commentators
Social philosophers
Sociologists of education
Sociologists of religion
Sociologists of science
Theoretical historians
Theorists on Western civilization
William Wyse Professors of Social Anthropology
Writers about activism and social change
Writers about communism
Writers about globalization
Writers about religion and science
Writers from Prague